Rosefield may refer to:

 Rosefield, Louisiana
 Rosefield, Saskatchewan
 Rosefield Township, Peoria County, Illinois
 Rosefield (Windsor, North Carolina), a NRHP-listed plantation house

People with the surname
 Joseph L. Rosefield (1882–1958), businessman